KSIS (1050 AM) is a radio station licensed to serve Sedalia, Missouri, United States. The station is owned by Townsquare Media and the license is held by Townsquare License, LLC.

Programming
KSIS broadcasts a blend of news, talk, and sports radio programming. The station derives some of its news programming from ABC News Radio. Notable syndicated talk programming on KSIS includes weekday shows hosted by Rush Limbaugh, Sean Hannity, and Michael Medved.  KSIS airs St. Louis Cardinals baseball games as a member of the St. Louis Cardinals Radio Network.

Local real estate agent Angel Morales hosts a Saturday morning Spanish language talk program called "Sábados Latinos". The name translates to "Latino Saturdays" in English.
The show is part of the station's outreach to mid-Missouri's growing Latino population.

History
KSIS first signed on at 1050 kHz as a 1,000 watt daytime-only station on February 18, 1954. The station was licensed to Yates Broadcasting Company, Inc., with Carl W. Yates, Jr., serving as president and general manager.

In November 1986, Yates Broadcasting Company, Inc., reached an agreement to sell this station to Bick Broadcasting Company.  The deal was approved by the FCC on December 9, 1986, and the transaction was consummated on December 30, 1986.

In April 2006, Bick Broadcasting Company reached an agreement to sell this station to Double O Radio subsidiary Double O Missouri Corporation. The deal was approved by the FCC on June 30, 2006, and the transaction was consummated on August 31, 2006. Double O Radio later merged with Townsquare Media.

References

External links
KSIS official website

SIS
News and talk radio stations in the United States
Radio stations established in 1954
Pettis County, Missouri
Townsquare Media radio stations
1954 establishments in Missouri